Close-up magic (also known as table magic or micromagic) is magic performed in an intimate setting usually no more than 3 meters (10 feet)  from one's audience and is usually performed while sitting at a table.

Sleight-of-hand, also known as prestidigitation ("quick fingers") or léger de main (Fr., "lightness of hand"), is the set of techniques used by a magician to secretly manipulate objects. Coins and playing cards are the most commonly used objects, but any small item can be used such as dice, bottle caps, sugar cubes, sponge balls, pebbles, pens, and cups and balls. A magician may use more than one kind of object in a single trick.

Close-up magicians may also enhance their performance by combining magic with other elements, such as card flourishes. While magic uses misdirection to produce an illusion, these flourishes are more straightforward displays of skill, comparable to juggling.

Another form of micromagic is micromentalism, mentalism performed in an intimate session. This form of mentalism involves examples of telekinesis, extrasensory perception, precognition and telepathy. Most cold reading takes place in such an intimate session, as do most theatrical séances.

Famous performers 

Jewel Aich
Jay Alexander
Michael Ammar
Tony Andruzzi
Keith Barry
Herbert L. Becker
Ariann Black
David Blaine
J.B. Bobo
Derren Brown
Matthias Buchinger
Charles Cameron
Canuplin
John Carney
John Cassidy
Milbourne Christopher
Ali Cook
Paul Curry
Steve Dacri
Paul Daniels
Daryl
Lewis Davenport
Dedi
Persi Diaconis
Dean Dill
Derek Dingle
Simon Drake
Geoffrey Durham
Tim Ellis
Alex Elmsley
S. W. Erdnase
Fakir of Ava (Isaiah Harris Hughes)
Martin Gardner
Paul Gertner
Walter B. Gibson
Andi Gladwin
Horace Goldin
Lennart Green
Brother John Hamman
Paul Harris
Ryan Hayashi
Whit Haydn
Johann Nepomuk Hofzinser
Burling Hull
Scott Interrante
Joshua Jay
Ricky Jay
Larry Jennings
Barry Jones
Richard Jones
Charles Jordan
Fred Kaps (Abraham Pieter Adrianus Bongers)
Gustavus Katterfelto
Igor Kio (Igor Emilievich Renard Kio)
Kostya Kimlat
Al Koran (Edward Doe)
Duane Laflin
René Lavand
Tom London
Harry Lorayne
Simon Lovell
Stuart Macleod
Gérard Majax (Gérard Fater)
Max Malini (Max Katz Breit)
Leon Mandrake
Matt Marcy
Ed Marlo
Doug McKenzie
Lisa Menna
Drummond Money-Coutts
Stephen Mulhern
Oscar Munoz
David Nixon
Lance Norris
Alain Nu
Shoot Ogawa
Okito (Tobias Bamberg)
Darwin Ortiz
Johnny Ace Palmer
Scott Penrose
Jacob Philadelphia (Jacob Meyer)
Franz Polgar
Fay Presto
Dominic Reyes
Étienne-Gaspard Robert
Brian Role
David Roth
Jerry Sadowitz
Jay Sankey
Ian Saville
John Scarne (Orlando Carmelo Scarnecchia)
Howie Schwarzman
Alan Shaxon (Alan Arthur Howson)
Michael Skinner
Tony Slydini
Thomas Solomon
David Stone
Tom Stone
Sylvester the Jester
Cyril Takayama
Juan Tamariz
Harlan Tarbell
Teller
Neil Tobin
Richard Turner
Dai Vernon
Michael Vincent
Val Walker
Roy Walton
Orson Welles
Gregory Wilson
Tommy Wonder
Herb Zarrow
Paul Zenon

Micro magic tricks 

The Best Coin Fold
Cups and balls
Ambitious card
Card warp
Floating match on card
French drop
Palming
Retention of vision vanish
Hummer card
The Four Burglars
Scotch and soda
Detachable thumb
Thumb tip
Glorpy
Healed and sealed
Zarrow shuffle
Card manipulation

References

Magic (illusion)